James R. "Jim" Roebuck Jr. (born February 12, 1945) is a Democratic politician who represented the 188th Legislative District (West Philadelphia) in the Pennsylvania House of Representatives. He was first elected in a special election on May 21, 1985. In 2020, he was defeated in the primary by Rick Krajewski.

Education
Roebuck is a 1963 graduate of Central High School. He earned a bachelor's degree in 1966 from Virginia Union University. He earned a Ph.D. in 1977 from University of Virginia. In 1969, Roebuck became the first African American Student Council president at UVA  From 1970 until 1977, he was a lecturer at Drexel University, and then was an assistant professor until 1984. In 1984 and 1985, he was legislative assistant in the Office for the Mayor of Philadelphia. Roebuck was a member of the Pennsylvania Legislative Black Caucus.

References

External links 
Pennsylvania House of Representatives - James R. Roebuck Jr. official PA House website
Project Vote Smart - Representative James R. Roebuck Jr. (PA) profile
Follow the Money - James R. Roebuck Jr.
2006 2004 2002 2000 1998 campaign contributions
Pennsylvania House Democratic Caucus - Rep. James R. Roebuck Jr. official Party website

Democratic Party members of the Pennsylvania House of Representatives
1945 births
Living people
Politicians from Philadelphia
University of Virginia alumni
Virginia Union University alumni
African-American state legislators in Pennsylvania
Educators from Pennsylvania
21st-century American politicians
21st-century African-American politicians
20th-century African-American people
Drexel University faculty